Transport Scotland is the national transport agency of Scotland. It was established by the Transport (Scotland) Act 2005, and began operating on 1 January 2006 as an Executive Agency of the Scottish Government.

Organization

Transport Scotland is an executive agency of the Scottish government that conducts transport projects, manages ScotRail, and also maintains all roads in Scotland, except motorways.

Directorates 
The agency is made up of eight directorates:

Aviation, Maritime, Freight and Canals 
Used for transport links to its remote and island communities. It is responsible for:

 project delivery, operational performance and policy development
 aviation, ferries and canals
 maritime interest including ports, harbours, and freight
 looking after Scottish ministers’ interests in Glasgow Prestwick Airport, David MacBrayne, Caledonian Maritime Assets, Highlands and Islands Airports, and Scottish Canals

Bus, Accessibility & Active Travel 
Responsible for the Scottish government's policy relating to buses, active travel, smart and integrated ticketing and accessible travel. Tasks include:

 enabling local authorities, operators and delivery partners to improve sustainable, accessible local transport options and get the travelling public back on the buses
 promoting walking, cycling and wheeling
 operating the concessionary bus travel scheme for disabled, old and young people
 working with operators to ensure all journeys on Scotland's bus, rail, ferry, subway and tram networks can be ticketed or paid for using smart technologies
 supporting the Mobility and Access Committee and the Active Nation Commissioner in their work to provide independent advice to ministers

Finance and Corporate Services 
Supports the operation and governance of Transport Scotland, including:

 providing core services and advice in the Finance, Human Resources, Learning and Development, Information Governance, IT, Facilities, Health and Safety, TS Secretariat, and Communications areas
 a leading role on a range of corporate governance functions including risk management, the operation of the Audit and Risk Committee and corporate reporting requirements

Low Carbon Economy 
Responsible for creating the strategic framework to coordinate the decarbonisation of Scotland's transport system, including:

 leading the Scottish Government's mission to remove the need for new petrol and diesel cars and vans by 2032
 delivering strategically coordinated investment in the charging network that reduces the need for electricity network upgrades and supports wider energy and transport system benefits
 promoting the uptake of ULEVs across public and private fleets while supporting wider sustainable transport outcomes
 harnessing Scotland's world class research and innovation expertise to support the expansion of low carbon transport and supply chains
 supporting sectors' transition toward a low carbon transport system, including through skills development

Major Projects 
Responsible for design, development, procurement and construction of major trunk road improvement projects across Scotland:

 leading and advising on procurement and contract management matters for Transport Scotland
 contributing to the ambition to become a Centre of Excellence for the delivery of major projects

Rail 
Responsible for Scotland's rail policy and delivery, including:

 managing the ScotRail and Caledonian Sleeper rail franchises
 developing rail policy and strategic planning, also aligning it with wider social and economic policy
 delivering major projects alongside industry partners
 promoting and investing in the development of sustainable rail freight
 managing economic regulation of the railways, and monitoring and advising on the affordability of the rail programme

Through Scottish Rail Holdings, its operator of last resort, Transport Scotland has taken ScotRail back into public ownership, and will do the same in June 2023 with Caledonian Sleeper.

Roads 
Responsible for:

 the safe operation and maintenance of the Scottish Trunk Road Network
 road policy
 road safety, including oversight of progress towards national casualty reduction targets 
 intelligent transport systems and lighting
 resilience, winter maintenance and transport planning of major events
 road and bridge design standards
 air quality and the environment, including climate change adaptation and asset management

Strategy & Analysis 
Responsible for transport strategy and integration, transport futures, transport analysis and strategic transport planning, including:

 developing the successor national transport strategy and setting transport investment priorities to support Scotland's economic strategy
 analytical research and evaluation
 transport appraisal and modelling
 transport and land use planning
 publishing national transport statistics to support evidence based policy
 the Transport (Scotland) Bill
 transport preparation for EU Exit
 climate change policy and transport's contribution to the Scottish Government Climate Change plan (updated in December 2020).
 transport policy integration
 transport futures
 transport governance including sponsorship of Regional Transport Partnerships, the Scottish Roadworks Commissioner, and transport components of city and regional growth deals.

Current strategic documents 
A second National Transport Strategy for Scotland was published in February 2020. The vision for the next 20 years is underpinned by four priorities: reducing inequalities, taking climate action, helping deliver inclusive economic growth and improving health and well-being. There are three associated outcomes for each priority.

Traffic Scotland
Through the Traffic Scotland service, Transport Scotland provides a public service that aims to deliver safe and reliable trunk roads. The focus of Traffic Scotland is to minimize the effects of congestion, breakdowns and unforeseen events on the trunk road network. The Traffic Scotland service delivers traveller information for the Scottish Trunk Road network through a process called 'monitor, control and inform'.

Monitor: The Traffic Scotland service monitors the network using CCTV, roadside hardware, communication with the police, weather forecasts and major event management services.
Control: All information collected through the monitoring process is processed within the Traffic Scotland Control Centre. The Traffic Scotland Control Centre operates 24 hours a day to ensure that traffic and travel information disseminated as part of the Traffic Scotland service is accurate.
Inform: Traffic and travel information processed by the Traffic Scotland Control Centre is then disseminated via the Traffic Scotland service, including the Traffic Scotland website, the Traffic Customer Care Line, road side Variable Message Signs (VMS) and via the multiple Traffic Scotland data services available to public, corporate and media users.

In November 2016 Traffic Scotland introduced a real-time service to allow drivers to track which roads had been gritted through the 'Trunk Road Gritter Tracker'.

Regional Transport Partnerships
The role of Regional Transport Partnerships (RTPs) is to strengthen the planning and delivery of regional transport developments.

The first task of each RTP was to prepare a regional transport strategy. This is supported by a delivery plan where RTPs set out when and how projects and proposals would be delivered.

Some RTPs are also responsible for the delivery of transport services. For example, the Strathclyde Partnership for Transport owns and operates the Glasgow subway and major bus stations across the west of Scotland.

The seven RTPs are:

 Shetland Transport Partnership (ZetTrans)
 Highlands and Islands Transport Partnership (HITRANS)
 North-East of Scotland Transport Partnership (NESTRANS)
 Tayside and Central Scotland Transport Partnership (Tactran)
 South-East of Scotland Transport Partnership (SESTRAN)
 Strathclyde Partnership for Transport (SPT)
 South-West of Scotland Transport Partnership (SWESTRANS)

See also
Transport in Scotland

References

External links 
 
 Traffic Scotland website

2006 establishments in Scotland
Executive agencies of the Scottish Government
Organisations based in Glasgow
Road transport in Scotland
Transport in Scotland
Interested parties in planning in Scotland
Road authorities
Transport organisations based in the United Kingdom